Hiroshi Suzuki may refer to:

, Japanese swimmer
Hiroshi Suzuki (trombonist) (born November 1933), Japanese trombonist
, better known as Papaya Suzuki, Japanese actor, dancer and television personality
, Japanese bobsledder
, Japanese baseball player
Hiroshi Suzuki (cinematographer), on films such as Love Letter
Hiroshi Suzuki, CEO of the Japanese corporation Hoya Corporation
Hiroshi Suzuki, CEO of the Japanese corporation skip Ltd.
Hiroshi Suzuki, President & CEO of the Toshiba Samsung Storage Technology Corporation